FIFA 07 (also known as FIFA Football 07 and FIFA 07 Soccer) is a football simulation video game developed by EA Canada and published by Electronic Arts under the EA Sports label.

It was the last game in the FIFA series to be released for the GameCube, Xbox and Game Boy Advance, and the third (although first in the main series) to be released for the Xbox 360 after FIFA 06: Road to FIFA World Cup and 2006 FIFA World Cup. It was also released for Microsoft Windows, PlayStation 2, PlayStation Portable, and Nintendo DS.

FIFA 07 sponsored Accrington Stanley for the 2007–08 season, with the FIFA 07 logo displayed on the back of the team's shirts.

Leagues

There are a total of 27 leagues available in FIFA 07. There is also an International league that features national football teams, and a Rest of World league that includes other notable clubs from around the world.

Xbox 360

Electronic Arts developed a new sports engine for the Xbox 360-version of FIFA 07. This meant not only improved graphics and better controls, but the physics and control were also improved. The game collects more data from the matches than previous version, and thus is able to give a "man of the match" award. The commentary in English is provided by Martin Tyler Xbox 360 only and Andy Gray appears in all versions and Clive Tyldesley commentates the other versions of the game and the commentary in Mexican Spanish is provided by Enrique Bermúdez and Ricardo Peláez.

Extra features include up-to-the-minute real-world game results via real-time, weekly podcasts and news ticker, detailed football stats, information and real-world news available in five languages. Finally, the Xbox 360 version offers a mini-game while the game loads, dropping the player in a one-on-one face off against the goalkeeper on a practice pitch. There is also very limited leagues on the Xbox 360 compared to the other consoles.

EA cut all but seven leagues from the Xbox 360 version of the game — one of which contained only one team (Juventus). According to producer Jean-Charles Gaudechon, this is because the new game engine took so long to develop that EA was not able to implement everything.

A FIFA 07 demo was made available on Xbox Live Marketplace on 6 October 2006.

Tournaments
FIFA 07 was also included in the Championship Gaming Series and the World Cyber Games.

Reception
The PlayStation 2 version of FIFA 07 received a "Double Platinum" sales award from the Entertainment and Leisure Software Publishers Association (ELSPA), indicating sales of at least 600,000 copies in the United Kingdom. ELSPA gave the PlayStation Portable release a "Platinum" certification, for sales of at least 300,000 copies in the region. In March 2007, Ron Moravek, Vice President and CEO at Electronic Arts Canada told Edmonton Journal Newspaper, that "FIFA 2007 has Sold Six Million Copies Worldwide."

Critical reception

The game was met with favorable reception. GameRankings and Metacritic gave it a score of 85.48% and 85 out of 100 for the Xbox version; 81.40% and 82 out of 100 for the PlayStation 2 version; 79.36% and 80 out of 100 for the PSP version; 77.77% and 78 out of 100 for the PC version; 77.19% and 80 out of 100 for the GameCube version; 74.05% and 73 out of 100 for the Xbox 360 version; 63% and 72 out of 100 for the DS version; and 30.50% and 41 out of 100 for the Game Boy Advance version.

Achievements and awards
UK: Seventh fastest selling game of all time
IGN: Game of the Year 2006: Best Sports Game (Xbox, PC)
IGN: Game of the Year 2006: Best Licensed Soundtrack (Xbox 360)
TeamXbox.com: Game of The Year 2006: Best Sports Game (Xbox)
UK: First FIFA title to top the UK Christmas chart since FIFA 98
AIAS Nominations (10th Annual Interactive Achievement Awards): Best Sports Game of 2006, Best Licensed Soundtrack of 2006
BAFTA Nominations (2007 Video Game Awards): The PC World Gamers Award (voted for by the public) (PS2)

References

External links

 

2006 video games
Esports games
Association football video games
2007
Game Boy Advance games
GameCube games
Nintendo DS games
PlayStation 2 games
PlayStation Portable games
Windows games
Xbox 360 games
Xbox games
EA Sports games
Video games developed in Canada
Video games set in 2006
Video games set in 2007
Video games set in Europe
Video games set in Portugal
Multiplayer and single-player video games
La Liga licensed video games
J2ME games
Exient Entertainment games